The Miami Open was a golf tournament on the PGA Tour from 1924 to 1955. It was played at what is now the Miami Springs Golf & Country Club in Miami, Florida. The event was played in December from 1924 to 1926 and from 1937 to 1955. It was played in early January from 1928 to 1937.

Winners
1955 Sam Snead (reduced to 54 holes by bad weather)
1954 Bob Rosburg
1953 Doug Ford
1952 Jack Burke Jr.
1951 Sam Snead
1950 Sam Snead
1949 Fred Haas
1948 Frank Stranahan (amateur)
1947 Jimmy Demaret
1946 Sam Snead
1945 Henry Picard
1944 Dutch Harrison
1943 Steve Warga
1942 Harold "Jug" McSpaden (unofficial win)
1941 Byron Nelson
1940 Byron Nelson
1939 Sam Snead
1938 Harold "Jug" McSpaden
1937 (Dec.) Sam Snead
1937 (Jan.) Ray Mangrum
1936 Willie Klein
1935 Tommy Armour
1934 Ralph Stonehouse
1933 Johnny Revolta
1932 Tommy Armour
1931 Joe Turnesa
1930 Gene Sarazen
1929 Gene Sarazen
1928 Gene Sarazen
1927 No tournament - switched from December to January
1926 Gene Sarazen
1925 Willie Klein
1924 Abe Mitchell

External links
Miami Spring Golf and Country Club
Miami Springs Golf Course history - Miami Open history on pages 6–9

Former PGA Tour events
Golf in Florida
Sports competitions in Miami